de Zeeuw is a surname of Dutch origin meaning "the Zeelander". Notable people with the surname include:

 Arjan de Zeeuw (born 1970), Dutch footballer
 Cornelis de Zeeuw (fl. 1560s), Flemish painter active in England
 Demy de Zeeuw (born 1983), Dutch footballer
 Dick de Zeeuw (1924–2009), Dutch agronomist and politician
 Francien de Zeeuw (1922–2015), Dutch resistance fighter and first female member of the Dutch armed forces
 Friso de Zeeuw (born 1952), Dutch jurist and Labour Party politician
 Gerard de Zeeuw (born 1936), Dutch systems scientist
 Maxime De Zeeuw (born 1987), Belgian basketball player
 Tim de Zeeuw (born 1956), Dutch astronomer and former Director General of ESO

See also
10970 de Zeeuw, a minor planet in the main belt named after Tim de Zeeuw
Marinus van Zeeuw or Marinus de Seeu  (c.1490–c.1546), Dutch painter

References

Dutch-language surnames